Slamna Vas is a village north of the town of Metlika in the White Carniola area of southeastern Slovenia, on the border with Croatia. The area is part of the traditional region of Lower Carniola and is now included in the Southeast Slovenia Statistical Region.

Name
Slamna Vas was attested in written sources in 1431 and 1490 as Slawndorf (and as Slandorf in 1490 and 1763–87, and also as Slamdorf in 1763–87). The medieval transcriptions indicate that the name is derived from *Slavna vas 'Slavo's village', with the first element referring to a hypocorism for a personal name such as *Dobroslavъ, *Pribyslavъ, etc. The assimilation of -vn- > -mn-, which produced the modern name, is attested elsewhere in Slovene. In the past the German name was Sleindorf.

Church
The local church is dedicated to the Holy Cross and belongs to the Parish of Metlika. It was built in the 18th century in the Baroque style and was extensively rebuilt in 1841.

References

External links
 
Slamna Vas on Geopedia

Populated places in the Municipality of Metlika